Club Korfbal Vallparadís is a Catalan korfball team located in Terrassa, playing home matches in the Pavelló Municipal de Sant Llorenç.

They are the first Catalan club winner of a European competition, the Europa Shield in 2009. In 2011 they won for the second time the Europa Shield, in Warsaw, and in 2013 for the third time, in Třeboň.

In the 2010/11 season the club was champion of Catalonia for the first time. In 2007 they were the Catalan Cup winners.

2011/12 squad

 Head coach: Miguel Ángel Tobaruela

Honours
 2006 - 2007: Catalonia's Cup winners
 2008 - 2009: Europa Shield winners.
 2010 - 2011: Europa Shield winners - Catalonia's League champions.
 2012 - 2013: Europa Shield winners.

References

External links
Vallparadís website
Vallparadís Catalonia Korfball Federation website

Korfball teams in Catalonia
Korfball teams